Mark Pinger  (born 26 June 1970) is a former freestyle swimmer from Germany, who won a total number of two bronze medals as a relay member at the Summer Olympics.

Pinger first did so in 1992 alongside Christian Tröger, Dirk Richter, and Steffen Zesner. Four years later, when Atlanta, Georgia hosted the Summer Olympics, he and Tröger finished third alongside brothers Bengt Zikarsky and Björn Zikarsky.

Pinger was born in Kenzingen, Baden-Württemberg. He now lives in Oregon and is the General Manager for Arena North America.  He swims on a regular basis with a Masters program at Stafford Hills Club which has an outdoor short course salt water pool located in Tualatin, OR.

References
  databaseOlympics.com
 sports-reference

1970 births
Living people
German male swimmers
Olympic swimmers of Germany
Swimmers at the 1992 Summer Olympics
Swimmers at the 1996 Summer Olympics
Olympic bronze medalists for Germany
Olympic bronze medalists in swimming
German male freestyle swimmers
Medalists at the 1996 Summer Olympics
Medalists at the 1992 Summer Olympics
Sportspeople from Freiburg (region)
20th-century German people
21st-century German people
People from Emmendingen (district)